James Daniel Booros (born April 22, 1951) is an American professional golfer who played full-time on the PGA Tour for nine years.

Booros played in about 250 events between 1977 and 1991 finishing in the top-125 on the money list five times. He won the 1989 Deposit Guaranty Golf Classic before that became an official PGA Tour event. His best finish in a major championship was a T-68 at the 1983 U.S. Open.

In 2004, Booros was inducted into the Lehigh Valley Golf Hall of Fame.

Professional wins (3)
1989 Deposit Guaranty Golf Classic
1996 Pennsylvania PGA Championship, Philadelphia Open Championship

See also

 Fall 1976 PGA Tour Qualifying School graduates
Fall 1980 PGA Tour Qualifying School graduates
 1987 PGA Tour Qualifying School graduates
1988 PGA Tour Qualifying School graduates

References

External links

American male golfers
PGA Tour golfers
Golfers from Pennsylvania
Sportspeople from Reading, Pennsylvania
Sportspeople from Allentown, Pennsylvania
1951 births
Living people